Maria Geertruida Snabilie (1776–1838) was a 19th-century painter from the Northern Netherlands.

Biography
She was born in Haarlem as the daughter of Louis Snabilié (c. 1730 – 1784) and Helena Krame. She became a flower painter and married Pieter Barbiers III in 1796 and became the mother of Pieter Barbiers IV and Maria Geertruida Barbiers. After marriage she signed her works "B.S." for Barbiers-Snabilie.

She died in Haarlem.

Works

References

Maria Geertruida Snabilie on Artnet

1776 births
1838 deaths
19th-century Dutch painters
Artists from Haarlem
Dutch women painters
19th-century Dutch women artists